Kamps, a Dutch and German family name, can refer to:

Bob Kamps (1931–2005), American rock climber 
Uwe Kamps (b. 1964), German football goalkeeper
 (b. c. 1965), American screenwriter
Haje Jan Kamps (b. 1981), Dutch photography writer
Gülcan Kamps (b. 1982), German TV presenter
Joeri de Kamps (b. 1992), Dutch football midfielder

See also
Kamp (surname)
Camps (disambiguation)
Kempes

References